In music, Op. 199 stands for Opus number 199. Compositions that are assigned this number include:

 Castelnuovo – Les Guitares bien tempérées
 Strauss – Le beau Monde